The coat of arms of Bulgaria consists of a crowned golden lion rampant over a dark red shield; above the shield is the Bulgarian historical crown. The shield is supported by two crowned golden lions rampant; below the shield there is compartment in the shape of oak twigs and white bands with the national motto "Unity makes strength" inscribed on them.

Description
The current coat of arms of Bulgaria was adopted in 1997. The current arms are a slightly redesigned version of the coat of arms of Bulgaria from the period 1927–1946. Those arms were based on a similar earlier form, firstly used by Tsar Ferdinand I (1887–1918) as his personal ruler's coat of arms. The previous emblem, which combined the traditional gold lion rampant with the pattern of the coat of arms of the Soviet Union, was abandoned since Communist rule ended in the country in 1989. The new Constitution of Bulgaria, adopted in 1991, describes the Bulgarian coat of arms as follows:

For many years, agreement on the design of the coat of arms was a source of great controversy in the Bulgarian government, as different parties argued over the design elements. The final design was legitimized in the Law for the coat of arms of the Republic of Bulgaria of 4 August 1997:

History

The earliest example of a lion's image as the heraldic symbol of Bulgaria is documented in the Lord Marshal's Roll, composed around 1294 AD and preserved in a copy from about 1640. In its first part under №15 is represented the coat of arms of Le Rey de Bugrie or the King of Bulgaria, most probably this of Tsar Smilets (1292–1298) or may be some of his recent predecessors. It consists of an argent lion rampant with golden crown over sable shield. In the end of 14th century an anonymous Arab traveller, who visited the capital of the Second Bulgarian Empire Tarnovo, saw and depicted three lions guardant passant gules painted on the round golden shields carried by the personal guards of Tsar Ivan Shishman (1371–1395). His manuscript is now kept in the National Library of Morocco.

After 1396, when all Bulgarian lands were subjugated by the Ottoman Empire but the Bulgarian crown was not given to the Ottoman Dynasty formally, the latter Bulgarian heraldic type as a sign of symbolically independent state was preserved in several European and Balkan collections of coats of arms. Gradually, new and in some cases quite different versions appeared, but the lion remained the most widespread heraldic symbol of Bulgaria and its rulers. In the Illyrian collection of Korenich-Neorich from 1595 the three walking lions, usual for some earlier Western Europe's collections, were replaced by one red lion rampant over golden crowned shield. In the beginning of the 18th century the Croatian heraldist Pavao Ritter Vitezović in two editions of his heraldic collection from 1701 and 1702 reversed the colours of this type and thus the lion became golden and the shield dark red.

This variant was adopted by the famous painter Hristofor Zhefarovich in his Stemmatographia, printed in 1741. His version became the most influential among Bulgarian intellectuals and revolutionaries in the period of the national awakening of Bulgaria, when the lion was considered and widely used as a major national symbol. After the liberational Russo-Turkish War (1877–1878) the coat of arms of Zhefarovich was laid in the base of the new state coat of arms, described in the Tarnovo Constitution of 1879 as follows:

The type and the details regarding the state coat of arms were not described clearly and were not standardized by a special Act. Because of this, for several decades they took different forms: lesser form; lesser form without supporters, compartment and motto, but covered with mantle from 1879 to 1880; greater form with supporters, bearing two national flags, compartment, motto and mantle from 1881 to 1927; middle form with supporters, compartment and motto from 1915 until 1918/20. Besides these there were different variations within these types. This perplexed situation was resolved by a special parliamentary commission, which sat after 1923. In 1927 it legitimated the middle form of the coat of arms, similar to these used as personal coats of arms by Bulgarian monarchs Ferdinand I and his son Tsar Boris III (1918–1943), but excluding all dynastic elements and preserving only the pure state symbolism.

Following 1944, new times began for the Bulgarian heraldry. In the communist era, the traditional type of coat of arms was replaced by an emblem which preserved the golden lion rampant placed over a non-historically-justifiable oval azure field, but encircled by the ears of wheat, folded by banners, a gear-wheel, a five-pointed red star and some other elements. This composition was derived principally from the pattern of the emblem of the Soviet Union. After the breakdown of the Bulgarian socialist republic in 1989 and several years of fierce partisan disputes, the traditional middle coat of arms from the period 1927–1946 was restored in 1991 with some minor changes.

The crown on top of the shield, and thus upon the shielded lion, according to the Coat of Arms of the Republic of Bulgaria Act, is supposed to be not that of the last Bulgarian monarchy (1879–1946), but that of the Second Bulgarian Empire (1185–1396). This empire was established by the brothers Peter and Asen, after it was freed from Byzantine control in the end of the 12th century, and it was subjugated by the Ottomans in the very end of the 14th century. In fact it significantly differs from the crowns known from medieval portraits such as these from the Tetraevangelia of Tsar Ivan Alexander (1331–1371).

There is a very popular belief that the three lions represent the three major portions and historical regions of Bulgaria — Moesia, Thrace and Macedonia, which has no connection with the native historical tradition and the principles of heraldry.

Historical coats of arms

See also

Flag of Bulgaria
Emblem of the People's Republic of Bulgaria
Mila Rodino
National Guards Unit of Bulgaria

References
Oswald, G., Lexicon der Heraldik,  Leipzig, 1984, p. 310.

External links

Bulgarian Heraldry and Vexillology Society 
History of the Bulgarian coat of arms 

National symbols of Bulgaria
Bulgaria
 
Bulgaria
Bulgaria
Bulgaria
Bulgaria